Pseudophichthys splendens, the purple-mouthed conger, is a species of eel in the family Congridae. It is the only member of its genus.

References

Congridae
Fish described in 1913
Monotypic fish genera
Monotypic marine fish genera
Monotypic ray-finned fish genera